The following is a list of document markup languages. You may also find the List of markup languages of interest.

Well-known document markup languages
 HyperText Markup Language (HTML) – the original markup language that was defined as a part of implementing World Wide Web, an ad hoc defined language inspired by the meta format SGML and which inspired many other markup languages.
 Keyhole Markup Language (KML/KMZ) - the XML-based markup language used for exchanging geographic information for use with Google Earth.
 Markdown - simple plaintext markup popular as language of blog/cms posts and comments, multiple implementations.
 Mathematical Markup Language (MathML)
 Scalable Vector Graphics (SVG)
 TeX, LaTeX – a format for describing complex type and page layout often used for mathematics, technical, and academic publications.
 Wiki markup – used in Wikipedia, MediaWiki and other Wiki installations.
 Extensible 3D (X3D)
 Extensible HyperText Markup Language (XHTML): HTML reformulated in XML syntax.
 XHTML Basic – a subset of XHTML for simple (typically mobile, handheld) devices. It is meant to replace WML, and C-HTML.
 XHTML Mobile Profile (XHTML MP) – a standard designed for mobile phones and other resource-constrained devices.

Metalanguages 
 Standard Generalized Markup Language (SGML) – a standard pattern for markup languages to which HTML and DocBook adhere.
 Extensible Markup Language (XML) – a newer standard pattern for markup languages; a restricted form of SGML that is intended to be compatible with it.

Lesser-known document markup languages
(including some lightweight markup languages)
 ABC notation - markup language for music scores in pure text.
 Amigaguide – The Amiga hypertext documentation format, including multimedia support.
 AsciiDoc - plaintext markup language similar to Markdown
 AsciiDoctor - plaintext markup language (extending AsciiDoc) AsciiDoctor
 Chemical Markup Language (CML)
 Compact HyperText Markup Language (C-HTML) – used for some mobile phones.
 Computable Document Format  - used for interactive technical documents.
 ConTeXt – a modular, structured formatting language based on TeX.
 Darwin Information Typing Architecture (DITA) - modular open free format for technical and specialized documents.
 DocBook – format for technical (but not only) manuals and documentation.
 eLML – eLesson Markup Language: create eLearning content
 Encoded Archival Description (EAD)
 Enriched text – for formatting e-mail text.
 GML
 Generalized Markup Language (GML)
 Geography Markup Language (GML)
 Gesture Markup Language (GML)
 Graffiti Markup Language (GML)
 GNU TeXmacs format – used by the GNU TeXmacs document preparation system
Guide Markup Language (GuideML) – used by the Hitchhiker's Guide site.
 Handheld Device Markup Language (HDML) – designed for smartphones and handheld computers.
 Help Markup Language (HelpML)
 Hypermedia/Time-based Structuring Language (HyTime)
 HyperTeX – for including hyperlinks in TeX (and LaTeX) documents.
 Information Presentation Facility (IPF) – is a system for presenting online help and hypertext on IBM OS/2 systems. It is also the default help file format used by the cross-platform fpGUI Toolkit project.
 JATS (Journal Article Tag Suite) –  a NISO standard of XML used to describe and publish STEM (scientific/technical/engineering/medical) scholarly journal articles 
 Koppla 
 LilyPond – a system for music notation.
 LinuxDoc – used by the Linux Documentation Project.
 Lout – a document formatting functional programming language, similar in style to LaTeX.
 Maker Interchange Format (MIF)
 Microsoft Assistance Markup Language (MAML)
 Music Encoding Initiative (MEI)
 Music Extensible Markup Language (MusicXML)
 Open Mathematical Documents (OMDoc)
 OpenMath – a markup language for mathematical formulae which can complement MathML.
 Parameter Value Language, stores mission data in NASA's Planetary Database System
 Plain Old Documentation (POD) – a simple, platform-independent documentation tool for Perl.
 Pillar - a markup syntax and associated tools to write and generate documentation written in Pharo
 PUB (markup language), an early scriptable markup language
 Remote Telescope Markup Language (RTML)
 reStructuredText (reSt) - plaintext platform-independent markup used as Python libraries documentation tool, multiple output formats (HTML, LaTeX, ODT, EPUB, ...)
 Retail Template Markup Language (RTML) – e-commerce language which is based on Lisp.
 Revisable-Form Text (RFT) – part of IBM's Document Content Architecture to allow transfer of formatted documents to other systems.
 S1000D – international specification for technical documentation related to commercial or military; aerospace, sea or land; vehicles or equipment.
 Scribble - Markup language based on Racket (programming language)
 Scribe – Brian Reid's seminal markup language
 Script – Early IBM markup language on which GML is built. 
 Semantic, Extensible, Computational, Styled, Tagged markup language (SECST)  - A more expressive and semantic alternative to Markdown that also transpiles to HTML.
 SiSU Structured Information, Serialized Units – generalized Markup language with several output formats
 SKiCal – a machine-readable format for the interchange of enhanced yellow-page directory listings.
 Skriv – lightweight markup language.
 Texinfo – GNU documentation format.
 Text Encoding Initiative (TEI) – Guidelines for text encoding in the humanities, social sciences and linguistics.
 Textile (markup language) – Plaintext XHTML web text.
Time Management Markup Language(TMML)  – For Time Management and rarely used for mobile alarm in 2008
 troff (typesetter runoff), groff (GNU runoff)
 UDO (markup language), a lightweight markup language
 Wireless Markup Language (WML), Wireless TV Markup Language (WTVML)
 Extensible Application Markup Language (XAML) XML based user interface markup language
 Xupl – a C-style equivalent to XML.

Office document markup languages
 Compound Document Format
 Office Open XML (OOXML) – open standard format for office documents:
 SpreadsheetML – spreadsheet language, part of Office Open XML
 PresentationML – presentations language, part of Office Open XML
 WordprocessingML – wordprocessing language, part of Office Open XML
 Microsoft Office 2003 XML formats – predecessor of Office Open XML
 OpenDocument (ODF) – open standard format for office documents
 OpenOffice.org XML – predecessor of OpenDocument
 ReportML – Report format language originating from Microsoft Access. (not a part of Office Open XML (yet))
 Rich Text Format (RTF) – Microsoft format for exchanging documents with other vendors' applications. (It is not really a markup language, as it was never meant for intuitive and easy typing.)
 Uniform Office Format (UOF) – open format for office documents, being harmonised with OpenDocument.

See also
 Comparison of document markup languages
 Comparison of Office Open XML and OpenDocument
 Lightweight markup language
Page description language

References

Document markup languages